Anastassiya Rostovchshikova (born ) is a Kazakhstani female volleyball player. She is part of the Kazakhstan women's national volleyball team.

She participated in the 2014 FIVB Volleyball World Grand Prix.
On club level she played for Kostanay in 2014.

References

External links
 Profile at FIVB.org

1994 births
Living people
Kazakhstani women's volleyball players
Place of birth missing (living people)
Volleyball players at the 2014 Asian Games
Asian Games competitors for Kazakhstan